Bonjour Tristesse (French "Hello, Sadness") is a 1958 British-American Technicolor film in CinemaScope, directed and produced by Otto Preminger from a screenplay by Arthur Laurents based on the novel of the same name by Françoise Sagan. The film stars Deborah Kerr, David Niven, Jean Seberg, Mylène Demongeot and Geoffrey Horne, and features Juliette Gréco, Walter Chiari, Martita Hunt and Roland Culver. It was released by Columbia Pictures. This film had color and black-and-white sequences, a technique unusual for the 1950s, but widely used in silent movies and early sound movies.

Plot
Cécile is a wealthy, free-spirited, idiosyncratic young woman. While she loves her playboy father Raymond dearly (and he loves her dearly), she is bored by suitors and the activities that interest them. While dancing to a performance of "Bonjour Tristesse," she wonders if she will ever find happiness again after what happened a year ago when she was 17 that summer on the French Riviera. The rest of the film chronicles the events of that summer in flashback.

Cécile and Raymond are enjoying their vacation on the Riviera, the latter's latest mistress being Elsa, a flighty, superficial, vain woman. Cécile meets another vacationer, Philippe, a mysterious but attractive young law student, and the two quickly take a liking to one another. One evening, Raymond receives a letter from Anne, an older woman, a dress designer, and a friend of Raymond's late wife, who will be staying at the villa. Anne and Raymond become close, but Cécile finds that Anne threatens to reform the undisciplined way of life that she has shared with her father.

Despite his promises of fidelity to Anne, Raymond cannot give up his playboy life. Helped by Elsa, Raymond's young and flighty mistress, Cécile does her best to break up the relationship with Anne. The combination of the daughter's disdain and the father's rakishness drives Anne to a tragic end.

Cast

Critical reception
The film met with a lukewarm critical reception at the time. The BFI's Monthly Film Bulletin wrote "The best performance is David Niven's; he gives his part a pathetic touch that the writing never attains. Jean Seberg, who speaks rather than acts her lines, turns in the least effective performance. Bonjour Tristesse is an elegant, ice cold, charade of emotions, completely artificial and eventually torpid." Others enjoyed it rather more and it had some unexpected fans. François Truffaut described Seberg as "The best actress in Europe". Jean-Luc Godard said "The character played by Jean Seberg (in Breathless) was a continuation of her role in Bonjour Tristesse, I could have taken the last shot of Preminger's film and started after dissolving to a title: "Three years later". An article in The Guardian, in 2012 described it as "an example of Hollywood's golden age, and both its star and its famously tyrannical director are ripe for rediscovery." Stanley Kauffmann described Bonjour Tristesse as tedious.

On Rotten Tomatoes, the movie has an approval rating 88% based on reviews from 24 critics. Critic Keith Uhlich of Time Out New York wrote: "the director uses the expansive CinemaScope frame and his eye for luxuriant, clinical mise en scène to soberly probe rather than gleefully prod. The cast is across-the-board exemplary. Niven and Kerr keenly satirize their onscreen iconographies—the cad and the goody-goody, respectively—but it's Seberg who cuts deepest."

Trivia 
Mylène Demongeot declared in a 2015 filmed interview: "David Niven was like a Lord, he was part of those great actors who were extraordinary like Dirk Bogarde, individuals with lots of class, elegance and humour. I only saw David get angry once. Preminger had discharged him for the day but eventually asked to get him. I said, sir, you had discharged him, he left for Deauville to gamble at the casino. So we rented a helicopter so they immediately went and grabbed him. Two hours later, he was back, full of rage. There I saw David lose his British phlegm, his politeness and class. It was royal. [Laughs]."

References

External links
 
 
 
 
 

1958 films
1958 drama films
American drama films
British drama films
Columbia Pictures films
Films based on French novels
Films based on works by Françoise Sagan
Films directed by Otto Preminger
Films set on the French Riviera
Films shot in Saint-Tropez
Films partially in color
Films scored by Georges Auric
Films with screenplays by Arthur Laurents
1950s English-language films
1950s American films
1950s British films